Sam Beard (born 3 May 1990 in Timaru, New Zealand) is a rugby union footballer. His regular playing position is Centre.

Career
Beard moved to Christchurch as a young player to pursue a career in rugby and kicked off matters in earnest with Burnside's championship-winning team.

He was then called up to the provincial Canterbury B team and, after an impressive season in which he was named player of the year, was brought into the Crusader Knights, the development squad of Super Rugby giants Crusaders.

Bay of Plenty then offered the midfielder the next step on the provincial ladder, where he played out his first season before being approached in 2013 to join Edinburgh in Scotland.

Having made his initial appearances for the team from the replacements' bench, Beard started a match for the first time on 28 February 2014, during which he ran in Edinburgh's second try in a victory over Ospreys.

Beard was contracted to Edinburgh until 2016, having signed a contract extension at the end of his first season with the club. On 22 February 2016, Beard signed a two-year deal with Welsh region the Dragons from the 2016–17 season. He was released by the Dragons at the end of the 2017–18 season.

Rugby Statistics

References 

Sam Beard is nephew of John Haggart

External links
Edinburgh profile
Dragons Profile

1990 births
Living people
Crusaders (rugby union) players
Dragons RFC players
Edinburgh Rugby players
Expatriate rugby union players in Scotland
Expatriate rugby union players in the United States
Expatriate rugby union players in Wales
New England Free Jacks players
New Zealand expatriate rugby union players
New Zealand expatriate sportspeople in Scotland
New Zealand expatriate sportspeople in Wales
New Zealand expatriate sportspeople in the United States
Rugby union centres
Rugby union players from Timaru